Chinnaiahgaripalli (CG Palli or Chinnayyagaripalli) is a small village in  Mydukur Mandal,  Kadapa District, Andhra Pradesh, India. It is located in between Yellampalli and Settivari Palli. This is one of the villages in Settivari Palli panchayat. Agriculture is the main source of income and also one employee in every home.

References

Villages in Kadapa district